Heart and Soul (also known as Heart) is a 1948 Italian drama film directed by Vittorio De Sica and Duilio Coletti, based on Edmondo de Amicis' novel Heart. De Sica won the Silver Ribbon for Best Actor by the Italian National Syndicate of Film Journalists.

Plot
The story is about a young student of an upper-class background whose classmates are of working-class backgrounds.

Cast
 Vittorio De Sica as Professor Perboni
 María Mercader as Clotilde Serra
 Lamberto Picasso
 Giorgio De Lullo as Lt. Renato Gardena
 Luigi Pavese as Lari, substitute teacher
 Ave Ninchi as Signora Serra, mother
 Carlo Ogliotti as Enrico Amici, student
 Gino Leurini as Garrone, student
 Luciano De Ambrosis as Precossi, student
 Gualtiero Tomiselli as Crossi, student
 Sergio Serardi as Franti, student
 Amerigo Martufi as 'Muratorino', student
 Vito Chiari as Coretti, student
 Geiogio Guglielmo as Votini, student
 Francesco Lengo as Nelli, student
 Rino Moretti as Stardi, student
 Carlo Delle Piane as Garoffi, student

References

External links

Heart and Soul on Variety Distribution

1948 films
1948 drama films
1940s war drama films
1940s Italian-language films
Italian black-and-white films
Films based on works by Edmondo De Amicis
Films directed by Vittorio De Sica
Films directed by Duilio Coletti
Italian war drama films
Films scored by Enzo Masetti
Films based on Italian novels
Works based on Heart (novel)
World War I films set on the Italian Front
1940s Italian films